The 2021–22 Minnesota Whitecaps season was the team's fourth year as a member of the Premier Hockey Federation.  They play their home games at TRIA Rink, the practice facility for the NHL's Minnesota Wild.  The Whitecaps opened the season on the weekend of November 6–7 in Boston playing against the Pride, dropping their first two games.  Their first home game, on November 20th, 2021 led to their first win of the season, also against the Pride.

Background

On June 28, 2021, the PHF announced the sale of the Buffalo Beauts and the Whitecaps to a joint partnership of NLTT Ventures, LLC, led by Andy Scurto, and Top Tier Sports, led by Neil Leibman. Leibman was named the team's governor.

Schedule and results

The regular season schedule was published on August 5, 2021.

News and notes

On December 10, 2021, the PHF announced that the December 11 and 12 games against the Buffalo Beauts had been cancelled due to inclement weather conditions affecting Buffalo's travel.  On December 16, 2021, those games were rescheduled for February 5 and 6, 2022.  On January 5, 2022, the PHF announced that all regular season games for the weekend of January 8 and 9, affecting the Whitecaps' games against the Toronto Six, were postponed due to COVID-19.

Regular season

|- style="background:#fcc;"
| 1 || November 6 || @ Boston Pride || 4–6 || || Leveille || Warrior Ice Arena || 0–1–0 || 0 || Recap
|- style="background:#fcc;"
| 2 || November 7 || @ Boston Pride || 0–1 || || Leveille || Warrior Ice Arena || 0–2–0 || 0 || Recap
|- style="background:#cfc;"
| 3 || November 20 || Boston Pride || 2–0 || || Leveille || TRIA Rink || 1–2–0 || 3 || Recap
|- style="background:#fff;"
| 4 || November 21 || Boston Pride || 1–2 || OT || Leveille || TRIA Rink || 1–2–1 || 4 || Recap
|- style="background:#fcc;"
| 5 || December 4 || @ Connecticut Whale || 1–5 || || Leveille || Danbury Ice Arena || 1–3–1 || 4 || Recap
|- style="background:#fcc;"
| 6 || December 5 || @ Connecticut Whale || 2–4 || || Leveille || Danbury Ice Arena || 1–4–1 || 4 || Recap
|- style="background:#ccc;"
| — || December 11 || Buffalo Beauts || – || colspan="6" | Postponed due to inclement weather
|- style="background:#ccc;"
| — || December 12 || Buffalo Beauts || – || colspan="6" | Postponed due to inclement weather
|- style="background:#fcc;"
| 7 || December 18 || Toronto Six || 0–4 || || Leveille || TRIA Rink || 1–5–1 || 4 || Recap
|- style="background:#fcc;"
| 8 || December 19 || Toronto Six || 1–2 || || Leveille || Roseville Ice Arena || 1–6–1 || 4 || Recap
|- style="background:#ccc;"
| — || January 8 || @ Toronto Six || – || colspan="6" | Postponed due to COVID-19 pandemic
|- style="background:#ccc;"
| — || January 9 || @ Toronto Six || – || colspan="6" | Postponed due to COVID-19 pandemic
|- style="background:#cfc;"
| 9 || January 22 || @ Buffalo Beauts || 3–1 || || Leveille || Northtown Center || 2–6–1 || 7 || Recap
|- style="background:#cfc;"
| 10 || January 23 || @ Buffalo Beauts || 6–1 || || Leveille || Northtown Center || 3–6–1 || 10 || Recap
|- style="background:#cfc;"
| 11 || February 5 || Buffalo Beauts || 8–1 || || Leveille || TRIA Rink || 4–6–1 || 13 || RescheduledRecap
|- style="background:#fcc;"
| 12 || February 6 || Buffalo Beauts || 2–6 || || Brenneman || TRIA Rink || 4–7–1 || 13 || RescheduledRecap
|- style="background:#fcc;"
| 13 || February 12 || @ Toronto Six || 2–6 || || Brenneman || Canlan Ice Sports – York || 4–8–1 || 13 || RescheduledRecap
|- style="background:#fcc;"
| 14 || February 13 || @ Toronto Six || 1–2 || || Brenneman || Canlan Ice Sports – York || 4–9–1 || 13 || RescheduledRecap
|- style="background:#cfc;"
| 15 || February 19 || Metropolitan Riveters || 5–2 || || Brenneman || TRIA Rink || 5–9–1 || 16 || Recap
|- style="background:#fcc;"
| 16 || February 20 || Metropolitan Riveters || 4–7 || || Friend || TRIA Rink || 5–10–1 || 16 || Recap
|- style="background:#fcc;"
| 17 || March 5 || Connecticut Whale || 2–4 || || Brenneman || TRIA Rink || 5–11–1 || 16 || Recap
|- style="background:#fcc;"
| 18 || March 6 || Connecticut Whale || 1–4 || || Blesi || TRIA Rink || 5–12–1 || 16 || Recap
|- style="background:#cfc;"
| 19 || March 12 || @ Metropolitan Riveters || 4–2 || || Blesi || Prudential Center Practice Facility || 6–12–1 || 19 || Recap
|- style="background:#fcc;"
| 20 || March 13 || @ Metropolitan Riveters || 3–4 || || Blesi || Prudential Center Practice Facility || 6–13–1 || 19 || Recap

|- style="text-align:center;"
|

Playoffs

The 5th-seeded Whitecaps defeated the 4th-seeded Metropolitan Riveters in the first round of the 2022 Isobel Cup Playoffs by a score of 4–1 on Friday, March 25th.  They advanced to play the #1 seed Connecticut Whale in the Semifinal game to be held on Sunday, March 27.

|- style="background:#cfc;"
| 1 || March 25 || Metropolitan Riveters || 4–1 || || Leveille || AdventHealth Center Ice || Box Score
|- style="background:#fcc;"
| 2 || March 27 || Connecticut Whale || 2–4 || || Leveille || AdventHealth Center Ice || Box Score

Player statistics

As of March 27, 2022

Skaters

Goaltenders

Bold/italics denotes franchise record.

Awards and honors

Milestones

Records

Honors

 Allie Thunstrom was named the February PHF Player of the Month

Transactions

Signings

Draft picks

Below are the Minnesota Whitecaps' selections at the 2021 NWHL Draft, which was held on June 29, 2021.

References

External links
 

Minnesota Whitecaps
PHF
2021–22 PHF season
2021–22 PHF season by team